Bitter Sweet Symphony is a 1997 song by The Verve.

Bittersweet Symphony may refer to:

Bittersweet Symphony (album), by Jade Valerie, 2008
Bittersweet Symphony (film), 2019